Texas Department of Information Resources (DIR) is a state agency of Texas. It has its headquarters in Suite 1300 in the William P. Clements Building in Downtown Austin.

References

External links
Texas Department of Information Resources

State agencies of Texas